Preolenna is a locality and small rural community of Waratah-Wynyard, Tasmania. The 2011 census determined a population of 287 for the state suburb of Lapoinya, which the locality of Preolenna forms part of.

History
Henry Hellyer traversed the region on an expedition in 1827. The location was noted for the presence of coal in the nearby Jessie Gorge/Maweena area and some 5000 acres of "first class milling" timber and "first class basaltic soils" (Loftus Hills, Government Surveyor, 1913).

The first grants of land were settled in 1910. In 1917 a tramway was constructed from Flowerdale to Preolenna to facilitate the coal mining operations, the track was later extended to Maweena in 1924. By the 1920s the community consisted of some 15 families and a local school which remained open until 1993.

The rail line was abandoned in 1931, as coal from the area lacked sufficient quality for viable use. Agricultural industry continued be the mainstay of local economic activity until the late 1990s, when the farms were gradually acquired by developers for eucalypt plantations.

Meunna
Eight farms were established at Preolenna for soldier settlement following World War II, referred to as the Preolenna Estate until being renamed to Meunna. The community hall was built by the settlers in 1955 and demolished in 1995, with a plaque now marking the location of the building. The Meunna locality is now unpopulated, with the exception of the Tarkine Wilderness Lodge, after the farms were acquired and converted to forestry plantation in the late 1990s.

Rural Youth Organisation of Tasmania
The origins of the Rural Youth Organisation of Tasmania lie with the establishment of the Preolenna Calf Club in the early 1930s by the headmaster of the local school. The first state conference was convened in the 1950s.

Notable people
Paul O'Halloran - a former Australian politician

Climate

References

External links
 Tarkine Wilderness Lodge
 Rural Youth Organisation of Tasmania Inc.

Localities of Waratah–Wynyard Council
Towns in Tasmania